Eutrypanus is a genus of beetles in the family Cerambycidae, containing the following species:

 Eutrypanus dorsalis (Germar, 1824)
 Eutrypanus mucoreus (Bates, 1872)
 Eutrypanus signaticornis (Laporte, 1840)
 Eutrypanus tessellatus White, 1855
 Eutrypanus triangulifer Erichson, 1847

References

Acanthocinini